Rathi (born 23 September 1982) is an Indian actress, who appears mostly in Tamil cinema and Telugu cinema. She made her feature film debut in Suki S. Murthy's 2002 Tamil film Gummalam. Later, she went on to do critically acclaimed performances in Solla Marandha Kadhai (2002). She had also dubbed for actress Genelia for the 2003 Tamil film Boys.

Early life
As a Tamilian girl, Rathi was born in Bangalore, Karnataka to Tamil people Arumugam and Bharani. She has two siblings, one elder sister and one younger brother. She was a student of dentistry at the Mathrushri Ramabai Ambedkar Dental College and Hospital in Bangalore. She is a trained classical dancer and had her Arangetram.

Career
She made her acting debut in the 2002 Tamil film Gummalam. She starred opposite Cheran in Thangar Bachan's Solla Marandha Kadhai. She appeared in a couple more Tamil films, including Adi Thadi starring Sathyaraj, but none of them were commercially successful. She had also performed an item number in the Tamil film Anjaneya featuring Ajith Kumar in the lead role.  She then migrated to Telugu cinema and acted in six films.

Between her careers in both film and television, she also managed to complete a bachelor's degree in genetics.

Public appearances
In 2003, Rathi created a sensation when she appeared on stage as a special guest in the 'Euphoria 03' event at the PSG College of Arts and Science.

Filmography

Voice artist
 Genelia D'Souza - Boys (2003)
 Diya -  Kodambakkam (2006)

Television

References

External links
 
  ( Credited as Radhi )

Social media account

•https://instagram.com/ra.thi187?igshid=11qqoxlw0tujr

1982 births
Living people
Actresses in Malayalam cinema
Actresses in Telugu cinema
21st-century Indian actresses
Actresses in Tamil cinema
Indian television actresses
Actresses in Kannada cinema
Indian film actresses
Actresses from Bangalore
Actresses in Tamil television
Actresses in Kannada television
Actresses in Telugu television
Female models from Bangalore